Montsecret-Clairefougère is a commune in the Orne department in northwestern France. It was formed in 2015 by the merger of the former communes Montsecret and Clairefougère.

See also
Communes of the Orne department

References

Communes of Orne